Carsten Winger (18 May 1907 – 19 August 1992) was a Norwegian actor.

He was born in Kristiania. Winger made his stage debut at Søilen Teater in 1932, and was later assigned with Chat Noir, Det Nye Teater, Oslo Nye Teater, Det Norske Teatret and Folketeatret. He participated in a number of films, including Fant (1937), Et spøkelse forelsker seg (1946), Gategutter (1949), Skadeskutt (1951), Kasserer Jensen (1954), three "Stompa" films (1962, 1963 and 1965) as "rector Ulrichsen", Alle tiders kupp (1964), Pappa tar gull (1964), Før frostnettene (1966) and Lukket avdeling (1972). He played in several television films and series, including  Den fjerde nattevakt (1960), Den uskyldige (1962), Skilsmissefeber (1967), Taxi (1969), Unnskyld hvis jeg forstyrrer (1975) and Farlig yrke (1976).

References

1907 births
1992 deaths
Male actors from Oslo
Norwegian male stage actors
Norwegian male film actors
Norwegian male television actors